Callionima is a genus of moths in the family Sphingidae first described by Hippolyte Lucas in 1857.

Species 
 Callionima acuta (Rothschild & Jordan, 1910)
 Callionima calliomenae (Schaufuss, 1870)
 Callionima denticulata (Schaus, 1895)
 Callionima elainae (Neidhoefer, 1968)
 Callionima ellacombei (Rothschild, 1894)
 Callionima falcifera (Gehlen, 1943)
 Callionima gracilis (Jordan, 1923)
 Callionima grisescens (Rothschild, 1894)
 Callionima guiarti (Debauche, 1934)
 Callionima inuus (Rothschild & Jordan, 1903)
 Callionima juliane Eitschberger, 2000
 Callionima nomius (Walker, 1856)
 Callionima pan (Cramer, 1779)
 Callionima parce (Fabricius, 1775) type species for the genus
 Callionima ramsdeni (Clark, 1920)

 names brought to synonymy
 Callionima elegans (Gehlen., 1935), a synonym for Callionima grisescens

References

External links 
 

 
Moth genera
Taxa named by Hippolyte Lucas